The 1998 Volta a Catalunya was the 78th edition of the Volta a Catalunya cycle race and was held from 18 June to 25 June 1998. The race started in Vila-seca and finished in Andorra la Vella. The race was won by Hernán Buenahora of the Vitalicio Seguros team.

Teams
Sixteen teams of up to eight riders started the race:

Route

General classification

References

1998
Volta
1998 in Spanish road cycling
June 1998 sports events in Europe